The Sumatran treeshrew (Tupaia ferruginea) is a treeshrew species within the Tupaiidae family. It was previously listed as a subspecies of Tupaia glis for one hundred years, but was raised up to species status in 2013. It is found on the islands of Sumatra and Tanahbala in Indonesia. It is the type species for the Tupaia genus.

References 

Treeshrews
Endemic fauna of Indonesia
Mammals of Indonesia